Ram Gopal Yadav (born 29 June 1946) is an Indian politician from Uttar Pradesh. He is the Secretary-General of the Samajwadi Party and the Member of Parliament (MP) in Rajya Sabha, since 2008. Yadav also served as Lok Sabha MP of Sambhal from 2004 to 2008.

On 23 October 2016, he was expelled from the party by Shivpal Singh Yadav, the state president of Samajwadi Party. He was accepted later in the party. On 30 December 2016, Samajwadi Party leader Mulayam Singh Yadav, who was also his cousin, expelled him from the party again for six years, but on the following day the expulsion was revoked by the party on constitutional grounds.

Early life
Ram Gopal Yadav was born on 29 June 1946 in Saifai village, Etawah district, Uttar Pradesh to Bachchi Lal Yadav and Phool Wati. He had a sister Geeta Devi, who died in August 2021.

Family

Ram Gopal Yadav is the cousin of Ratan Singh Yadav, Mulayam Singh Yadav, Abhay Ram Yadav, Rajpal Singh Yadav and Shivpal Singh Yadav. Kamla Devi Yadav is his cousin sister.

Arvind Pratap who has served as MLC in Uttar Pradesh Legislative Council is the nephew of Ram Gopal Yadav (through his sister Geeta).

Positions held 
Ram Gopal Yadav has been elected 1 time as Lok Sabha MP and 5 times as Rajya Sabha MP.

Other positions
 1989–1992: Chairman, Zila Parishad, Etawah
 1994–2004: Leader of Samajwadi Party parliamentary group in Rajya Sabha
 2004: Leader of Samajwadi Party in Lok Sabha
 September 2013–present: Leader of Samajwadi Party in Rajya Sabha
 2017: Selected as Secretary-General of Samajwadi Party

Personal life
On 4 May 1962, Ram Gopal Yadav married Phoolan Devi  and the couple had 1 daughter and 3 sons including Akshay Yadav. Phoolan Devi died in August 2010.

One of his son, Asit Yadav (Billu Yadav), died in a road accident in 1999. Later Billu's wife Abhilasha Yadav married Anurag Yadav (brother of Dharmendra Yadav) in 2004.

Books 

 Lohia Ka Samajwad
 Sansad Main Meri Baat

References

External links

1947 births
Living people
People from Saifai
People from Etawah
Politicians from Moradabad
India MPs 2004–2009
Samajwadi Party politicians
Lok Sabha members from Uttar Pradesh
People from Sambhal district
Rajya Sabha members from Uttar Pradesh
Dr. Bhimrao Ambedkar University alumni
Chhatrapati Shahu Ji Maharaj University alumni
Ram
Samajwadi Party politicians from Uttar Pradesh